Sven Hedin Glacier is a glacier north of Princess Marie Bay on central Ellesmere Island, Nunavut, Canada. The glacier has the name of Sven Hedin. The Oxford University Ellesmere Land expedition visited the glacier in the year 1935. The Glacier appeared to be advancing in 1935.

See also
List of glaciers in Canada

References

 Nunavut Handbook, Iqaluit 2004, 
 Noel Humphreys, Edward Shackleton and A. W. Moore: Oxford University Ellesmere Land expedition. In: Geogr. J. Vol. 37, 1936. pp. 385-441. (See p. 412.)
 Ernest Shackleton: Arctic Journeys - The Story of the Oxford University Ellesmere Land Expedition 1934–1935. Hodder and Stoughton Ltd., London 1937 and Farrar & Rinehart, New York 1938)

External links
 Encarta: Princess Marie Bay and Nunavut.
 Glaciers in the arctic (p. 108), pdf
 Oxford University Ellesmere Land Expedition. 
 Oxford University Ellesmere Land expedition 1934-1935 collection.

Glaciers of Qikiqtaaluk Region
Ellesmere Island
Arctic Cordillera